David Nalbandian was the defending champion, but did not compete this year.

Finnish player Jarkko Nieminen defeated Danish first seed Kristian Pless in the all-Nordic final, 6–7, 6–3, 6–4.

Seeds

  Kristian Pless (final)
  Irakli Labadze (quarterfinals)
  José Acasuso (second round)
  Danai Udomchoke (third round)
  Guillermo Coria (second round)
  Éric Prodon (first round)
  Jarkko Nieminen (champion)
  Phillip King (quarterfinals)
  Todor Enev (third round)
  Mardy Fish (quarterfinals)
  Joachim Johansson (first round)
  Nicolas Mahut (semifinals)
  Andy Roddick (first round)
  Maximillian Abel (third round)
  Levar Harper-Griffith (third round)
  Mario Ančić (second round)

Draw

Finals

Top half

Section 1

Section 2

Bottom half

Section 3

Section 4

References
Main Draw

Boys' Singles
US Open, 1999 Boys' Singles